Arenal is a district of the Tilarán canton, in the Guanacaste province of Costa Rica. The relocated town of Nuevo Arenal is located in this district.

History 
Arenal was created on 16 April 1979 by Decreto Ejecutivo 10002-G.

Geography 
Arenal has an area of  km² and an elevation of  metres.

Locations 
Poblados: Mata de Caña, Sangregado, San Antonio, Unión

Demographics 

For the 2011 census, Arenal had a population of  inhabitants.

Transportation

Road transportation 
The district is covered by the following road routes:
 National Route 142
 National Route 143
 National Route 734

References 

Districts of Guanacaste Province
Populated places in Guanacaste Province